The New York, Philadelphia and Norfolk Railroad  was a railroad line that ran down the spine of the Delmarva Peninsula from Delmar, Maryland to Cape Charles, Virginia and then by ferry to Norfolk, Virginia. It became part of the Pennsylvania Railroad system.

History

The NYP&N was the vision of William Lawrence Scott, an Erie, Pennsylvania, coal magnate, who wanted to build a shorter railroad route between the coal wharfs of Hampton Roads by utilizing a ferry line across the Chesapeake Bay and a railroad line up the Delmarva Peninsula to the industrial north. Scott enlisted engineering help from Pennsylvania Railroad Vice-President, Alexander J. Cassatt, who saw the merits of the plan and took a hiatus from PRR to work on the new line. Cassatt surveyed the line on horseback, designed ferries and wharfs, acquired other railroads, most notably the Eastern Shore Railroad (1853), and the line was ready for operation in 1884. The line was financed by many PRR interests and was officially merged into the PRR in 1921.

Passenger service
Through the first half of the 20th century, several trains a day ran along the train line. From the 1920s to the 1950s, the PRR operated the day train, the Del-Mar-Va Express, and the night train, the Cavalier. At peak levels in the mid-1940s, the company also operated southbound, the Furlough, and an additional night train, the Mariner, in addition to unnamed local trains. Northbound the PRR added the Sailor, the Mariner night train, and an unnamed local train. 

By 1957 the named trains were gone, and all that remained was a once-a-day Philadelphia–Cape Charles train.  In 1958, the route was shortened: from Philadelphia to Delmar, Delaware at the Delaware–Maryland border.  The last train was a Wilmington–Delmar train, Blue Diamond, ending in 1965.

Ferry service

The original ferry crossing was 30 miles, which was later reduced to 26 miles when the terminals were relocated. Both passenger and freight ferries existed. Up to 30 freight cars could be loaded on flat barges pulled by a tugboat for the trip. The original passenger ferries, Cape Charles & Old Point Comfort, side-wheeler paddle steamers, could hold an entire train on their two tracks.  In 1889 the New York the first propeller driven ship, 200 feet long, 31 feet beam was built for the run to Norfolk, and in 1890 the Pennsylvania, a  larger vessel (260 feet long, 36 feet beam) was added. In 1907 the Maryland was built with the same dimensions, and the last ship was the Virginia Lee.

Demise

Because most of the route served a rural area, revenue expectations were never met. Branches were abandoned and the final remnant of passenger service, a shuttle between Philadelphia, Pennsylvania and Delmar, Delaware, was discontinued in the mid-1960s. NYP&N’s identity was lost with the Penn Central merger and the formation of Conrail. With the breakup of Conrail many short-line railroads acquired parts of the route – freight service between Pocomoke City, Maryland, and Norfolk, Virginia was operated by the Eastern Shore Railroad between 1981 and 2006 and the Bay Coast Railroad between 2006 and 2018. The section north of Pocomoke City was operated by Norfolk Southern Railway as its Delmarva Secondary. In 2016, the Delmarva Central Railroad took over operations from Norfolk Southern and the line is now part of the Delmarva Central Railroad's Delmarva Subdivision. In 2018, the Delmarva Central Railroad took over operations from the Bay Coast Railroad between Pocomoke City and Hallwood, Virginia while the line between Hallwood and Cape Charles was abandoned.

See also

Pennsylvania Railroad
 Bay Coast Railroad 
 Train ferry: United States for a list of current and former car floats and train ferries

References

Predecessors of the Pennsylvania Railroad
Defunct Virginia railroads
Defunct Maryland railroads
Defunct Delaware railroads